The 2019–20 season was Atlético Madrid's 89th season since foundation in 1903 and the club's 83rd season in La Liga, the top league of Spanish football. Atlético competed in La Liga, Copa del Rey, Supercopa de España and UEFA Champions League.

The season was the first for the club since 2013–14 without Antoine Griezmann, who joined FC Barcelona in the summer of 2019 (although he return two-seasons later on a loan)

Kits

Players

Transfers

In

 Total Spending: €261M

Out

 Total Income: €307.5M

Net Income:  €46.5M

Pre-season and friendlies

Summer

Competitions

Overview

La Liga

League table

Results summary

Results by round

Matches
The La Liga schedule was announced on 4 July 2019.

Copa del Rey

Supercopa de España

UEFA Champions League

Group stage

Knockout phase

Round of 16

Quarter-finals

Statistics

Squad statistics

1Players from reserve team - Atlético Madrid B.

Goalscorers

1Player from reserve team - Atlético Madrid B.

Clean sheets

Attendances

Awards

References

External links

Atlético Madrid seasons
Atlético Madrid
Atlético Madrid